Napoléon, Prince Imperial (Napoléon Eugène Louis Jean Joseph Bonaparte; 16 March 1856 – 1 June 1879), also known as Louis-Napoléon, was the only child of Napoleon III, Emperor of the French, and Empress Eugénie. After his father was dethroned in 1870, he moved to England with his family. On his father's death in January 1873, he was proclaimed by the Bonapartist faction as Napoleon IV.

In England, he trained as a soldier. Keen to see action, he persuaded the British to allow him to participate in the Anglo-Zulu War. In 1879, serving with British forces, he was killed in a skirmish with a group of Zulus. His early death caused an international sensation and sent shockwaves throughout Europe, as he was the last serious dynastic hope for the restoration of the House of Bonaparte to the throne of France.

Biography

Louis-Napoléon was born at the Tuileries Palace in Paris, and he was baptised on 14 June 1856 at Notre Dame Cathedral. His godfather was Pope Pius IX, whose representative, Cardinal Patrizi, officiated. His godmother was Eugène de Beauharnais's daughter, Josephine, the Queen of Sweden, who was represented by Grand Duchess Stéphanie of Baden.

His education, after a false start under the academic historian Francis Monnier, was from 1867 supervised by General Frossard as governor, assisted by Augustin Filon as a tutor. His English nurse, Miss Shaw, was recommended by Queen Victoria and taught the prince English from an early age. His valet Xavier Uhlmann and his inseparable friend Louis Conneau also figured prominently in his life. The young prince was known by the nickname "Loulou" in his family circle. In 1868, he visited Corsica and attended the centenary festival of the annexation of the island to France.

At the outbreak of the Franco-Prussian War of 1870–1871, he accompanied his father as a sub-lieutenant to the front. The prince was present on the hills above Saarbrücken during the engagement at their base. Still, when the war began to go against the Imperial army, his father sent him to the border with Belgium. In September, his father sent him a message to cross over into Belgium. He travelled from there to England, arriving on 6 September, where his parents joined him, the Second Empire having been abolished. The family settled in England at Camden Place in Chislehurst, Kent. Upon his father's death in 1873, Bonapartists proclaimed him Napoleon IV. On his 18th birthday, a large crowd gathered to cheer him at Camden Place.

The prince attended elementary lectures in physics at King's College London. In 1872, he applied and was accepted to the Royal Military Academy, Woolwich. He finished seventh in his class of thirty-four and came top in riding and fencing. He then served for a time with the Royal Artillery at Aldershot.

During the 1870s, there was some talk of a marriage between him and Queen Victoria's youngest daughter, Princess Beatrice. Queen Victoria also reportedly believed that it would be best for "the peace of Europe" if the prince became Emperor of France.  The prince remained a devout Catholic, and he retained hopes that the Bonapartist cause might eventually triumph if the secularising Third Republic failed. He supported the tactics of Eugène Rouher over those of Victor, Prince Napoléon, breaking with Victor in 1876.

With the outbreak of the Zulu War in 1879, the prince, with the rank of lieutenant, forced the hand of the British military to allow him to take part in the conflict, despite the objections of Rouher and other Bonapartists. He was only allowed to go to Africa by the special pleading of his mother, Empress Eugénie, and by the intervention of Queen Victoria herself. He left England on 27 February 1879 with letters of introduction from the Duke of Cambridge in the hope he might be allowed to follow the movements of the troops. Once he arrived at Durban, he joined the General's Head-Quarters and met Frederic Thesiger, 2nd Baron Chelmsford, the commander in South Africa, on 9 April and was nominally placed on his staff. The prince accompanied Chelmsford on his march into Zululand.  Keen to see action and full of enthusiasm, he was warned by Lieutenant Arthur Brigge, a close friend, "not to do anything rash and to avoid running unnecessary risks.  I reminded him of the Empress at home and his party in France."

Chelmsford, mindful of his duty, attached the prince to the staff of Colonel Richard Harrison of the Royal Engineers, where it was felt he could be active but safe.  Harrison was responsible for the column's transport and for reconnaissance of the forward route on the way to Ulundi, the Zulu capital.  While he welcomed the presence of the prince, he was told by Chelmsford that the prince must be accompanied at all times by a strong escort.  Lieutenant Jahleel Brenton Carey, a French speaker and British subject from Guernsey, was given particular charge of him. The prince took part in several reconnaissance missions. However, his eagerness for action almost led him into an early ambush when he exceeded orders in a party led by Colonel Redvers Buller.  Despite this, on the evening of 31 May 1879, Harrison agreed to allow the prince to scout in a forward party scheduled to leave in the morning, mistakenly believing that the path ahead was free of Zulu skirmishers.

Death

On the morning of 1 June 1879, the troop set out, earlier than intended and without the whole escort, largely owing to the prince's impatience. Led by Carey, the scouts rode deeper into Zululand. Without Harrison or Buller present to restrain him, the prince took command from Carey, even though the latter had seniority. At noon, the troop was halted at a temporarily deserted kraal while the prince and Carey made some sketches of the terrain and used part of the thatch to make a fire. No lookout was posted. As they were preparing to leave, about 40 Zulus fired upon them and rushed towards them, screaming. The prince's horse dashed off before he could mount, the prince clinging to a holster on the saddle. After about 100 yards, a strap broke; the prince fell beneath his horse, and his right arm was trampled. He leapt up, drawing his revolver with his left hand, and started to run, but the Zulus outpaced him.

The prince was speared in the thigh but pulled the assegai from his wound. As he turned and fired on his pursuers, another assegai, thrown by a Zulu named Zabanga, struck his left shoulder. The prince tried to fight on, using the assegai he had pulled from his leg, but, weakened by his wounds, he sank to the ground and was overwhelmed. When recovered, his body had 18 assegai wounds; one stabbing had burst his right eye and penetrated his brain. The Zulus stripped the body of everything, except for a few medals. They did not dismember his body because of a necklace worn around his neck, given to him by his mother; which was misconstrued for a magical talisman.

Two of his escort were killed, and another was missing. Carey led his men back to camp. The prince's body was recovered the next day. After a court of inquiry, a court-martial, and intervention by Empress Eugénie and Queen Victoria, Carey returned to his regiment. Carey died in Bombay on 22 February 1883.

Louis-Napoléon's death caused an international sensation. Rumours spread in France that the prince had been intentionally "disposed of" by the British. Alternatively, the French republicans or the Freemasons were blamed. In one account, Queen Victoria was accused of arranging the whole thing, a theory that was later dramatised by Maurice Rostand in his play Napoleon IV. The Zulus later claimed that they would not have killed him if they had known who he was. Langalabalele, his chief assailant, was killed in July at the Battle of Ulundi. Eugénie later made a pilgrimage to Sobuza's kraal, where her son had died, and where the Prince Imperial Memorial, paid for by Queen Victoria, had been erected. The prince, who had begged to be allowed to go to war and who had worried his commanders by his dash and daring, was described by Garnet Wolseley, 1st Viscount Wolseley, as "a plucky young man, and he died a soldier's death. What on earth could he have done better?"

His decomposed body was brought back to Spithead on board the British troopship , and thence transferred onto HMS Enchantress for sailing on to Woolwich Arsenal; overnight, he lay in state in the western octagonal guardhouse by the riverfront. The funeral procession, including Queen Victoria, went from there to Chislehurst, where he was buried. On 9 January 1888, his body was transferred to a special mausoleum constructed by his mother as the Imperial Crypt at St Michael's Abbey, Farnborough, next to his father.

The Prince Imperial had appointed Prince Napoléon Victor Bonaparte as his heir, thus skipping the genealogically senior heir, Victor's father, Prince Napoléon.

Legacy

In 1880, the inhabitants of Chislehurst erected a monument to the Prince Imperial on Chislehurst Common near Camden Place, which is now Grade II listed. In the 1950s, the road which passes the monument, previously called Station Road, was renamed Prince Imperial Road in his memory.

The Australian Rules football club Footscray, inspired by the story of the prince's death, renamed their club to the Prince Imperial Football Club in the early 1880s, but they reverted back to Footscray a mere two years later.

The asteroid moon Petit-Prince was named after the Prince Imperial in 1998, because it orbits an asteroid named after his mother (45 Eugenia).

In literature
The death is presented in some detail in G. A. Henty's The Young Colonists: A Tale of The Zulu and Boer Wars (1885).

In the R. F. Delderfield novel Long Summer Day (the first of the A Horseman Riding By trilogy), Boer War veteran Paul Craddock buys a farm in 1900 or 1901. The middle-aged estate manager, Rudd, is somewhat embittered at having been one of the soldiers who had failed to rescue the Prince Imperial in 1879. Craddock is aware of the events because, by coincidence, he had been born that very day.

Emma Lazarus wrote sonnets, under the common title of "Destiny", commemorating the prince's birth and death. 

In the play Napoleon IV by Maurice Rostand, the prince is killed in a carefully planned ambush arranged with the connivance of Queen Victoria.

In a 1943 Southern Daily Echo article, former Sapper George Harding (2nd Company Royal Engineers) recalled being ordered to take a horse ambulance and find the prince's body and bring it back to the column. The Prince Imperial had been out on reconnaissance mission with a party of the 17th Lancers. Describing the mission, he said
We advanced to a dried-up river bed and had to cut away the banks to get the ambulance across. Eventually, we reached a kraal beside a large mealie field where we found the bodies of the Prince and some of his party. They had been surprised by Zulus as they rested in the kraal. The Zulus broke out of the mealie field and killed them before they could remount their horses. The Prince had been stabbed 16 times with assegais. We made a rough coffin and put his body in the ambulance. After burying the other bodies where they were found, we went back to the column. The Prince's body was taken back to England for burial.

The Prince Imperial is a minor character in Donald Serrell Thomas's Sherlock Holmes pastiche novel Death on a Pale Horse (2013).

Titles, styles, honours and arms

He was styled Prince Imperial of France from birth.

French honours
 Knight Grand Cross of the Legion of Honour

Foreign honours 
 : Grand Cross of the Order of St. Stephen, 1865
 : Knight of the Order of the Elephant, 11 March 1865
  Mexican Empire:
 Grand Cross of the Order of Guadalupe, 1864
 Grand Cross of the Order of the Mexican Eagle, 1865
 :
 Grand Cross of the Order of the Tower and Sword, 1861
 Grand Cross of the Sash of the Two Orders, 1865
 : Knight of the Order of St. Andrew the First-called, 30 May 1865.
  Kingdom of Sardinia: Knight of the Order of the Annunciation, 20 February 1859
 : Knight of the Order of the Rue Crown, 1857
 : Knight of the Order of the Golden Fleece, 30 March 1856
   Sweden-Norway: Knight of the Royal Order of the Seraphim, 14 June 1856

Arms

See also
Railway of the Prince Imperial

References

Citations

Bibliography

 Balansó, Juan (mayo de 1999). "Capítulo VI. Las hijas de Isabel", Las perlas de la corona, 2ª edición, Plaza Janés, p. 126. .
 David, Saul Zulu. Penguin/Viking, 2004, pp 311–336.
 
 
 
 
 
 Morris, Donald R. The Washing of the Spears. Simon & Schuster, 1965, pp 511–545.

Further reading
 Ellen Barlee, Life of Napoleon, Prince Imperial of France, (London, 1889)
 M. d'Hérrison, Le prince impérial, (Paris, 1890)
 André Martinet, Le prince impérial, (Paris, 1895)
 R. Minon, Les derniers jours du prince impérial sur le continent, (Paris, 1900)
 Ernest Barthez, Empress Eugenie and her Circle, (New York, 1913)
 Digby Hague-Holmes Napoleon the Fourth, (Farnborough, St. Michael's Abbey Press, 2016)

External links 

 
 

1856 births
1879 deaths
1879 in South Africa
Alumni of King's College London
Bonapartist pretenders to the French throne
British Army personnel of the Anglo-Zulu War
British military personnel killed in the Anglo-Zulu War
French emigrants to England
French military personnel of the Franco-Prussian War
French people of Scottish descent
French people of Spanish descent
Graduates of the Royal Military Academy, Woolwich
Grand Croix of the Légion d'honneur
2
2
Grand Crosses of the Order of Saint Stephen of Hungary
Heirs apparent who never acceded
House of Bonaparte
Knights of the Golden Fleece of Spain
Napoleon III
Nobility from Paris
Princes of France (Bonaparte)
Royal Artillery officers
Children of national leaders of France
Sons of emperors